Antonio Colomban (5 February 1932 – 18 May 2020) was an Italian football player and coach.

Playing career
Born in Fasana d'Istria, Colomban, a midfielder, played youth football with Milan and professionally with Messina, Cagliari and Taranto.

Coaching career
Colomban began his coaching career in 1957, managing Messina, Torres, Olbia, Gallipoli, Vittoria, Igea Virtus, Gela, and Catania, retiring in 1993.

References

1932 births
2020 deaths
Italian footballers
A.C. Milan players
A.C.R. Messina players
Cagliari Calcio players
Taranto F.C. 1927 players
Serie B players
Association football midfielders
Italian football managers
A.C.R. Messina managers
Catania S.S.D. managers
S.E.F. Torres 1903 managers
Olbia Calcio 1905 managers
A.S.D. Gallipoli Football 1909 managers
A.C.D. Città di Vittoria managers
A.S.D. Igea Virtus Barcellona managers
S.S.D. Città di Gela managers